Clifton Marcel Crosby (born September 17, 1974) is a former professional American football player who played defensive back for four seasons for the St. Louis Rams and the Indianapolis Colts in the National Football League. After retiring from the NFL in 2004, he refocused his energy to become a motivational speaker and youth advocate.

1974 births
Living people
Sportspeople from Erie, Pennsylvania
Players of American football from Pennsylvania
American football defensive backs
Maryland Terrapins football players
Cincinnati Bengals players
St. Louis Rams players
Indianapolis Colts players
Kansas City Chiefs players